James (Jeremiah) Griffiths  (19 September 1890 – 7 August 1975) was a Welsh Labour Party politician, trade union leader and the first Secretary of State for Wales.

Background and education
He was born in the predominantly Welsh-speaking village of Betws, near Ammanford in Carmarthenshire. The youngest of ten children; his father, William Griffiths was the local blacksmith. He spoke no English until he was five. Educated at Betws Board School, he left at the age of 13 to work at Ammanford No. 1 colliery (Gwaith Isa'r Betws), where he eventually became Lodge Secretary. Griffiths was a pacifist and while campaigning against the Great War met fellow socialist Winifred Rutley, and they married in October 1918. His brother (David Rees Griffiths, 1882–1953) was a Welsh poet who took the bardic name of 'Amanwy' after his native valley.

Political career
Griffiths continued his education by attending night school and became an active socialist. He helped establish a branch of the Independent Labour Party in Ammanford in 1908 and soon became its secretary. Later, he occupied the powerful post of secretary of the newly formed Ammanford Trades Council (1916–1919). At the age of 29, he left the colliery on a miner's scholarship (1919–1921) to the Central Labour College, London, where at the same time Aneurin Bevan and Morgan Phillips were studying. 

On returning home, Griffiths worked as Llanelli Labour Party agent (1922–1925), before becoming an agent for the Anthracite Miners' Association (1925–1936), and President of the powerful South Wales Miners' Federation – known locally as the Fed – in the Anthracite district of West Wales  (1934–1936). In 1936, he was elected Labour Member of Parliament (MP) for what was then safe seat of Llanelli. Three years later, he continued his rise through the Labour movement by getting elected to the party's National Executive Committee. In 1942, he led 97 Labour MP's to vote against the Labour Party's compromise with Winston Churchill's Conservative Party for the government to neither endorse nor condemn the Beveridge Report recommending the establishment of a comprehensive welfare state in postwar Britain. Despite the defiance of the party leadership, the vote boosted Labour's popularity by demonstrating its support for the report's recommendations. 

Following Labour's victory at the 1945 general election, he was made a Privy Counsellor and Minister for National Insurance by Prime Minister Clement Attlee. In this role, he was responsible for creating the modern state benefit system. He introduced the Family Allowances Act 1945, the National Insurance Act 1946 and the National Assistance and Industrial Injuries Act 1948. Along with Bevan, he was one of the chief architects of the British welfare state. He served as Chairman of the Labour Party (1948–1949), and in 1950 he became Secretary of State for the Colonies. Within two years, though, the Labour Party was out of office. 

During the long period in opposition, Griffiths became Deputy Leader of the Labour Party (1955–1959), and spokesman on Welsh affairs. He used his good relationship with Hugh Gaitskell to commit the Labour Party to a measure of devolution. Amid the Suez Crisis of 1956, he made an important speech opposing the underhanded tactics of the then Prime Minister Anthony Eden in which he stated: "This is for our country a black and tragic week... an unjustifiable and wicked war". This was said to sum up the mood of many at the time.

Given Griffiths' determination in having campaigned for a Secretary of State for Wales ever since the 1930s, Harold Wilson persuaded him to delay retirement and serve as the first Secretary of State for Wales following Labour's 1964 general election victory. At Wilson's instigation, Griffiths established the Welsh Office and laid the foundations for the role until the 1966 general election, whereupon he returned to the backbenches. He was appointed a Companion of Honour. 

Though by now suffering from ill-health, Griffiths avoided resigning from the House of Commons, because he feared that if he did so, Labour would lose a by-election in Llanelli. Plaid Cymru had captured the neighbouring seat of Carmarthen in 1966; and the Llanelli Rugby coach Carwyn James was poised to stand for Plaid Cymru in a by-election, had Griffiths stood down. He remained in Parliament until 1970 and was succeeded in Llanelli by Denzil Davies, who fended off the Plaid Cymru challenge. The previous year, Griffiths had published his autobiography, Pages From Memory (London: Dent, 1969).

Personal life
He died in Teddington, Greater London, aged 84, leaving two sons and two daughters. He is buried at the Christian Temple chapel in Ammanford. In a memorial address, Jim Callaghan, prime minister (1976–79), described him as "one of the greatest sons of Wales. We honour the memory of Jim Griffiths of Ammanford. I mention his birth place because, despite all his honours and journeyings, it was the place of his birth, deep in the heart of Wales, that essentially shaped his life and actions."

Bibliography

 Plan for Britain: A Collection of Essays prepared for the Fabian Society by G D H Cole, Aneurin Bevan, Jim Griffiths, L F Easterbrook, Sir William Beveridge, and Harold J Laski (Not illustrated with 127 text pages).
Griffiths, James. Pages from Memory. London: J. M. Dent & Sons, 1969.
 Griffiths, Winifred. One Woman's Story (privately printed, 1979)

References

External links
 Election leaflet held by the national Library of Wales
 Selection of his writings
 
Biography of James (Jeremiah) Griffiths (1890 - 1975), Labour politician and cabinet minister. Y Bywgraffiadur Cymreig (Dictionary of Welsh Biography).
James Griffiths Papers in the National Library of Wales

1890 births
1975 deaths
People from Carmarthenshire
Welsh Labour Party MPs
British Secretaries of State
Secretaries of State for the Colonies
Secretaries of State for Wales
Members of the Fabian Society
Members of the Privy Council of the United Kingdom
Members of the Order of the Companions of Honour
Miners' Federation of Great Britain-sponsored MPs
National Union of Mineworkers-sponsored MPs
UK MPs 1935–1945
UK MPs 1945–1950
UK MPs 1950–1951
UK MPs 1951–1955
UK MPs 1955–1959
UK MPs 1959–1964
UK MPs 1964–1966
UK MPs 1966–1970
Welsh socialists
Chairs of the Labour Party (UK)
Members of the Parliament of the United Kingdom for Carmarthenshire constituencies
Ministers in the Attlee governments, 1945–1951
Ministers in the Wilson governments, 1964–1970